Shinobu Asagoe and Katarina Srebotnik were the defending champions, but Srebotnik did not compete this year. Asagoe teamed up with María Vento-Kabchi and lost in the final 7–5, 4–6, 6–3 against Gisela Dulko and Maria Kirilenko.

It was the 2nd WTA title for both Dulko and Kirilenko in their respective doubles careers.

Seeds

Draw

References
 ITF Tournament profile

2005 Japan Open Tennis Championships